Porterie is a surname. Notable people with the surname include:

Donovan Porterie (born 1987), American football player
Gaston Louis Noel Porterie (1885–1953), American judge